The 152nd Massachusetts General Court, consisting of the Massachusetts Senate and the Massachusetts House of Representatives, met in 1941 and 1942.

Senators

Representatives

See also
 1942 Massachusetts gubernatorial election
 77th United States Congress
 List of Massachusetts General Courts

References

External links
 
 
 

Political history of Massachusetts
Massachusetts legislative sessions
massachusetts
1941 in Massachusetts
massachusetts
1942 in Massachusetts